Coleophora kearfottella is a moth of the family Coleophoridae first described by William Barnes and August Busck in 1920. It is found in North America, including New Jersey, Ontario, Quebec and Prince Edward Island.

The larvae feed on the leaves of Salix (including Salix bebbiana and Salix discolor) and Ribes species. They create a lobe case.

References

kearfottella
Moths described in 1920
Moths of North America